The Volkswagen Race Touareg 2 was an off-road competition car specially designed to take part in the rally raids with the main objective of winning the Dakar Rally.

Dakar victories

NOTE:  Because of the 2007 killing of French tourists in Mauritania, the ASO postponed and relocated the Dakar Rally in 2008, and the race became the 2008 Central Europe Rally.  The ASO deferred all Dakar entries to that event, which is technically part of the Dakar lineage.

See also
Volkswagen Touareg

References

External links
 Volkswagen Race Touareg 2 Specs

Rally cars
Rally raid cars
Dakar Rally winning cars